Charlie Stemp (born 30 November 1993) is an English actor. Stemp came to prominence for his leading role as Arthur Kipps in the West End musical Half a Sixpence, which earned him a WhatsOnStage Award for Best Actor in a Leading Role in a Musical and nomination for a 2017 Laurence Olivier Award for Best Actor in a Leading Role in a Musical.

Early life and education 

Stemp was born and raised in Peckham, London. He attended the Belcanto London Academy Theatre School, and trained for three years at Laine Theatre Arts in Epsom. He is also a keen football and rugby player.

Acting career
After graduating, Stemp performed in Wicked in London's West End and was cast as Eddie in the international tour of the musical Mamma Mia!. Stemp also appeared in the film Knarcolepsy.

Stemp appeared as the lead actor in Sir Cameron Mackintosh’s production of Half a Sixpence, written by Julian Fellowes. He first performed the role at Chichester Festival Theatre from July to September 2016. In October 2016, the musical transferred to the Noel Coward Theatre in the West End, and extended its booking to 2 September 2017. For this role, Stemp won the WhatsOnStage Award for Best Actor in a Leading Role in a Musical and was nominated for the 2017 Laurence Olivier Award for Best Actor in a Leading Role in a Musical.

Stemp appeared on Broadway in the revival of Hello, Dolly!, starting on 20 January 2018, officially on 22 February 2018, as Barnaby Tucker. He took over the role originally played by Taylor Trensch. This marked his Broadway debut. The show closed on 25 August 2018.

On 13 September 2018 it was announced that Stemp would be playing the role of Bert in a West End revival of Mary Poppins opposite Zizi Strallen in the title role, due to open at the Prince Edward Theatre in the autumn of 2019.

Theatre Credits

Accolades

Stage

See also
 List of British actors

References

1993 births
Living people
British people of English descent
People from Peckham
English male actors
Male actors from London
English male musical theatre actors
21st-century English male actors
Theatre World Award winners